George Hirsch is an American musician who performs as a vocalist in the hardcore band Blacklisted and solo folk project under the moniker Harm Wülf. He was originally from Philadelphia, Pennsylvania but later moved to Chicago, Illinois.

Music career 
When his previous band broke up, George Hirsch co-founded the hardcore punk band Blacklisted in 2003.

After Blacklisted released the more experimental album No One Deserves To Be Here More Than Me in 2009—an album with lyrics born out of Hirsch's struggles with depression—the band entered an undeclared hiatus state as each member focused on their respective new families and lives. In this downtime, Hirsch launched his solo project Harm Wülf, a stripped down semi-acoustic act that's often described as "dark folk". He released his debut album as Harm Wülf titled There's Honey In the Soil So We Wait for the Till... in November 2013 through Deathwish Inc.

Three years later, Harm Wülf released its second studio album Hijrah in August 2016 through Deathwish. Hirsch has said he felt like his debut album was more of a demo in some ways and that Hijrah felt like a more proper album. The album's title is a reference and alternate spelling of Hegira, which was the event when the prophet Muhammad and his followers traveled from Mecca to Medina. The lyrics of the album deal feelings of isolation and loneliness after moving to Chicago and only knowing his girlfriend and also healing through escape. The album's cover art is a photo of the Solheimasandur plane crash in Iceland taken by Hirsch himself and chosen as the cover because it fit the theme of the album. Hirsch said: "I was torn at first because it is such a recognizable attraction. But, in the end it fit the album/feel so well. It lends itself perfectly to escape, exile, and the abandon I've felt, before ultimately learning the survival I needed. While writing the album I also had an obsession with this certain color; it's a blue, but has hints of green and purple as well."

Recent years have seen Hirsch releasing solo music under his home recording moniker "Rose Clouds", and a return to his roots in a hardcore punk band called "Staticlone".

Personal life 
Aside from music, Hirsch has had short stories and his amateur photography published. The story "Goodnight" in the Heartworm Press compilation "#23"  and Roger Gastman compiled book "Enamelized" and movie "Infamy", being most notable.

Discography

Harm Wülf 
 There's Honey In the Soil So We Wait for the Till... (2013)
 Hijrah (2016)

Rose Clouds 
 Doldrums Heavy Shadows (2021)

 Until The Candle Burns Down (2021)

Blacklisted 

 ...The Beat Goes On (2005)
 Heavier Than Heaven, Lonelier Than God (2008)
 No One Deserves To Be Here More Than Me (2009)
 When People Grow, People Go (2015)

As guest musician

References

External links 
  

1984 births
Living people
Musicians from Philadelphia
American punk rock singers
21st-century American singers